Jnanadeepa School is an educational institution in Shivamogga District, Karnataka, India. It is run by the private education foundation Sri Aurobindo Foundation for Education (SAFE) through the Jnanadeepa Vidya Samsthe which also runs Sri Aurobindo PU College, Shimoga. The institution follows the CBSE curriculum and was the first private institution in the district to be affiliated to CBSE, Delhi.

The school was started in 1999 with 36 students but now enrolls 1,850. The school started with classes 5 and 6 and grew to cover classes 1 to 10.

Tests/exams and evaluation

For classes 1 to 5
There is no formal written exam. Performance is continuously assessed by oral testing, worksheets, involvement and response in classes and other activities. Reports are sent to the parents periodically. Students are evaluated not only in academic performance but also in decorum, regularity of work, ability to communicate, handwriting, observation, and application skills. Normally there is no failure up to class 5 as long as a student has the required minimum attendance of 80%.

For classes 6 and 7
There is continuous assessment of students' performance through unit tests, half-yearly exam and an annual exam. In all the unit tests and exams, 20% of marks is internal and 80% external (i.e. for written test/exam). Punctuality, cleanliness, completion of homework and assignments on time, project/practical works, performance in co-curricular activities, and general discipline are considered for awarding internal assessment marks.

For classes 8, 9, 10
Students have weekly tests/four unit tests, half-yearly and annual exams.

For classes 6 and 7
A student having a minimum of 80% attendance will be declared promoted to the next higher class if they score a minimum of 35% in each subject and 40% in aggregate. The marks for final promotion are 50% from the annual exam, 25% from the half-yearly exam and the remaining 25% from all the unit tests.

Facilities
Facilities include games, sports, music, dance, drawing, painting and hobbies.

Syllabus
The school, follows the CBSE syllabus. The medium of instruction is English; Kannada/Sanskrit and Hindi are the other languages taught.

Motto and crest
The school motto is the Sanskrit slogan "sá vidhyá yaä vimuktayë" from the Upanishads. The school emblem is a crest with a lotus at the bottom. The lotus holds a book which signifies the caring support by the teachers for the children's education and the respect for knowledge. Further above the book is an altar with the inscribed letters SAFE signifying the school organisation and the care and safety of the child. Upon it is a humble lamp which shows the glow of knowledge. The crest is surrounded by the name of the institution and atop stands the motto of the school.

External links
 www.jdsj.org

Schools in Shimoga district
Educational institutions established in 1999
1999 establishments in Karnataka
Schools affiliated with the Sri Aurobindo Ashram